Sharmin may refer to the following people:
Given name
Sharmin Akhter (born 1995), Bangladeshi cricketer 
Sharmin Ali, Indian author and entrepreneur
Sharmin Meymandi Nejad, Iranian writer 
Sharmin Ratna (born 1988), Bangladeshi sports shooter
Sharmin Sultana Rima, Bangladeshi kabaddi player 
Sharmin Sultana Shirin (born 1989), Bangladesh chess player

Surname
Shaila Sharmin (born 1989), Bangladeshi cricketer

See also
Sharmin murder case